Juk (also known as Suai, Souei, Xuay) is a Mon–Khmer language of the Bahnaric branch spoken in Sekong Province, Laos. According to Sidwell (2003), it was probably a northern dialect of Jru' that had differentiated through separation by migration.

The Juk language was discovered by Thai linguist Therapan L-Thongkum. Juk speakers live in the village Ban Nyôkthông (Gnôkthông), located about 12 km north of Ban Kafe. It is located halfway between the towns of Tateng and Sekong.

References

Sidwell, Paul (2003). A Handbook of comparative Bahnaric, Vol. 1: West Bahnaric. Pacific Linguistics, 551. Canberra: Research School of Pacific and Asian Studies, Australian National University.

Bahnaric languages
Languages of Laos